Saphenista semistrigata is a species of moth of the family Tortricidae. It is found in Puerto Rico. Its wings are olive, black, and cream, in a mottled pattern with a defined olive streak running up the wing.

References

Moths described in 1931
Saphenista